Wu Xueqian (December 19, 1921 – April 4, 2008) was a Chinese politician and diplomat who served as the Foreign Minister and Vice Premier of the People's Republic of China.

Biography
Wu was born in Shanghai in 1921. He joined the Communist Party of China in 1939.

In his youth he was engaged in Communist underground work in Shanghai, serving for a period of time as deputy secretary and acting secretary of the Shanghai Students' Committee of the Communist Party. In June 1949, he was designated representative of China National Federation of Democratic Youth to the World Federation of Democratic Youth in Prague. After the founding of the People's Republic of China, he served as Deputy Director General and Director General (1949–1958) of the International Liaison Department of the Central Committee of the Youth League (renamed as the Communist Youth League later), Director General (1958–1978) and Vice Minister (1978–1982) of the International Liaison Department of CCCPC, First Vice-Foreign Minister (1982.4–1982.11).

Wu was the Foreign Minister of China from 1982 to 1988. He was the member of the 13th CPC Politburo from 1987 to 1992.

Wu died of an illness on April 4, 2008.

References

1921 births
2008 deaths
Foreign Ministers of the People's Republic of China
People's Republic of China politicians from Shanghai
Jinan University alumni
20th-century Chinese politicians
Members of the 13th Politburo of the Chinese Communist Party
State councillors of China
Members of the 12th Politburo of the Chinese Communist Party
Vice Chairpersons of the National Committee of the Chinese People's Political Consultative Conference
Burials at Babaoshan Revolutionary Cemetery